The 1982 Ladies European Tour was the fourth season of golf tournaments organised by the Women's Professional Golfers' Association (WPGA), which later became the Ladies European Tour (LET). There were ten tournaments on the schedule including the Women's British Open, organised by the Ladies' Golf Union.

The tour experienced difficulties during 1982. Having lost several sponsors during 1981 due to economic problems, their principal supporter Carlsberg had also departed. Twelve new tournaments were planned to fill out the calendar but only half took place, including Ford Ladies Classic and the Ladies Spanish Open. Plans for new events in Ireland, France, West Germany and Portugal were abandoned, and several other tournaments were cancelled during the season, including the British Women's Matchplay and two of the new events.

The Order of Merit was won for the second time by Jenny Lee Smith, who again dominated the season with one win and five runner-up finishes; her £12,551 in prize money put her more than £5,500 clear of runner-up Rosie Jones.

Tournaments
The table below shows the 1982 schedule. The numbers in brackets after the winners' names show the number of career wins they had on the Ladies European Tour up to and including that event. This is only shown for members of the tour. 

Major championships in bold.

Order of Merit
The Order of Merit was sponsored by Hambro Life and based on prize money won throughout the season.

See also
1982 LPGA Tour

References

External links
Official site of the Ladies European Tour

Ladies European Tour
Ladies European Tour
Ladies European Tour